is a near-Earth object and potentially hazardous asteroid of the Amor group,   approximately  in diameter. It has an eccentric orbit that brings it sometimes close to Earth's orbit, and sometimes halfway between Mars and Jupiter. It is a dark D-type asteroid which means that it may be reddish in color.

Due to its relatively low transfer cost of ~5.5 km/s,  was under consideration by the European Space Agency as a candidate target for the Don Quijote mission to study the effects of impacting a spacecraft into an asteroid; however, it is no longer under consideration.

 orbits the Sun at a distance of 1.0–2.7 AU once every 2 years and 7 months (932 days; semi-major axis of 1.87 AU). Its orbit has an eccentricity of 0.45 and an inclination of 1° with respect to the ecliptic.

References

External links 
 MPEC 2002-A53, Minor Planet Electronic Circular
 List of the Potentially Hazardous Asteroids (PHAs), Minor Planet Center
 PHA Close Approaches To The Earth, Minor Planet Center
 List Of Amor Minor Planets (by designation), Minor Planet Center
 
 
 

Minor planet object articles (unnumbered)

D-type asteroids (SMASS)
20020108